Bloomberg Businessweek, previously known as BusinessWeek, is an American weekly business magazine published fifty times a year. Since 2009, the magazine is owned by New York City-based Bloomberg L.P. The magazine debuted in New York City in September 1929. Bloomberg Businessweek business magazines are located in the Bloomberg Tower, 731 Lexington Avenue, Manhattan in New York City and market magazines are located in the Citigroup Center, 153 East 53rd Street between Lexington and Third Avenue, Manhattan in New York City.

History
Businessweek was first published based in New York City in September 1929, weeks before the stock market crash of 1929. The magazine provided information and opinions on what was happening in the business world at the time. Early sections of the magazine included marketing, labor, finance, management and Washington Outlook, which made Businessweek one of the first publications to cover national political issues that directly impacted the business world.

Businessweek was originally published to be a resource for business managers. However, in the 1970s, the magazine shifted its strategy and added consumers outside the business world. , the magazine was carrying more advertising pages annually than any other magazine in the United States.  Businessweek began publishing its annual rankings of United States business school MBA programs in 1988.

Stephen B. Shepard served as editor-in-chief from 1984 until 2005 when he was chosen to be the founding dean of the CUNY Graduate School of Journalism. Under Shepard, Businessweeks readership grew to more than six million in the late 1980s. He was succeeded by Stephen J. Adler of The Wall Street Journal. In 2006, Businessweek started publishing annual rankings of undergraduate business programs in addition to its MBA program listing.

Recession and Bloomberg LP acquisition
Businessweek suffered a decline in circulation during the late-2000s recession as advertising revenues fell one-third by the start of 2009 and the magazine's circulation fell to 936,000. In July 2009, it was reported that McGraw-Hill was trying to sell Businessweek and had hired Evercore Partners to conduct the sale. Because of the magazine's liabilities, it was suggested that it might change hands for the nominal price of $1 to an investor who was willing to incur losses turning the magazine around.

In late 2009, Bloomberg L.P. bought the magazine—reportedly for between $2million to $5million plus assumption of liabilities—and renamed it Bloomberg BusinessWeek. It is now believed McGraw-Hill received the high end of the speculated price, at $5million, along with the assumption of debt.

2010−2018 
In early 2010, the magazine title was restyled Bloomberg Businessweek (with a lowercase "w") as part of a redesign. , the magazine was losing $30million per year, about half of the $60million it was reported losing in 2009. Adler resigned as editor-in-chief and was replaced by Josh Tyrangiel, who had been deputy managing editor of Time magazine. In 2016, Bloomberg announced changes to Businessweek, which was losing between $20 and $30 million. Nearly 30 Bloomberg News journalists were let go across the U.S., Europe and Asia and it was announced that a new version of Bloomberg Businessweek would launch the following year. In addition, editor in chief Ellen Pollock stepped down from her position and Washington Bureau Chief Megan Murphy was named as the next editor in chief. Megan Murphy served as editor from November 2016; until she stepped down from the role in January 2018 and Joel Weber was appointed by the editorial board in her place.

"The Big Hack" controversy  
On October 4, 2018, Bloomberg Businessweek published "The Big Hack: How China Used a Tiny Chip to Infiltrate U.S. Companies", an article by Jordan Robertson and Michael Riley which claimed that China had hacked dozens of technology corporations including Amazon and Apple by placing an extra integrated circuit on a Supermicro server motherboard during manufacturing.

The claims by Bloomberg have been heavily questioned. By 2 p.m. on the day of publication, Apple, Amazon, and Supermicro issued blanket denials, which Bloomberg reported. Within the week, the United States Department of Homeland Security stated that it saw no reason to question those refutations. The National Security Agency and Government Communications Headquarters and NCSC also denied the article's claims.

Redesign
In early 2010, the magazine title was restyled Bloomberg Businessweek (with a lowercase "w") as part of a redesign. During the following years, the bold, eclectic, playful, and memetic face of Businessweek was cultivated largely by Businessweek Creative director, Richard Turley then Rob Vargas (from 2014), and Deputy Creative director Tracy Ma (from 2011 through 2016). During her time at Businessweek, Ma worked on over 200 issues. Now she is the Visual Editor at The New York Times Styles desk.

Additional versions
International editions of Businessweek were available on newsstands in Europe and Asia until 2005 when publication of regional editions was suspended to help increase foreign readership of customized European and Asian versions of Businessweek website. However, the same year the Russian edition was launched in collaboration with Rodionov Publishing House.

At the same time, Businessweek partnered with InfoPro Management, a publishing and market research company based in Beirut, Lebanon, to produce the Arabic version of the magazine in 22 Arab countries.

In 2011, Bloomberg Businessweek continued the magazine's international expansion and announced plans to introduce a Polish-language edition called Bloomberg Businessweek Polska, as well as a Chinese edition which was relaunched in November 2011.

Bloomberg Businessweek launched an iPad version of the magazine using Apple's subscription billing service in 2011. The iPad edition was the first to use this subscription method, which allows one to subscribe via an iTunes account. There are over 100,000 subscribers to the iPad edition of Businessweek.

Honors and awards
In the year 2011, Adweek  named Bloomberg Businessweek as the top business magazine in the country. In 2012, Bloomberg Businessweek won the general excellence award for general-interest magazines at the National Magazine Awards. Also in 2012, Bloomberg Businessweek editor Josh Tyrangiel was named magazine editor of the year by Ad Age. In 2014, Bloomberg Businessweek won a Society of American Business Editors and Writers Best in Business award for magazines, general excellence.

Name and spelling history
 The Business Week (name at founding)
 Business Week and later BusinessWeek (names under McGraw-Hill Education ownership)
 Bloomberg BusinessWeek (initial name under Bloomberg ownership)
 Bloomberg Businessweek (current name; 2010–present)

Employees 
Notable present and former employees of the magazine include:

 Stephen B. Shepard, former editor-in-chief of BusinessWeek (1984–2005) and founding dean of the CUNY Graduate School of Journalism
 Elliott V. Bell, former publisher and editor-in-chief of BusinessWeek and Superintendent of Banks for the State of New York, advisor to Thomas E. Dewey 
 Robert Kolker, former investigative journalist and author of Hidden Valley Road
 Brad Stone, former investigative journalist and author of books on tech companies
 Josh Tyrangiel, former editor and deputy managing editor of Time magazine
 Malcolm Muir, founder of the magazine, president of McGraw-Hill Publishing (1928–1937)
 Virgil Jordan, former editor and past president of The Conference Board
 Judith H. Dobrzynski, former senior editor 
 Stephen J. Adler, former editor-in-chief of BusinessWeek (2005–2009), editor-in-chief of Reuters (2011–2021)
Carla Robbins, former reporter and deputy editorial page editor of The New York Times (2007–2012)

See also
 Bloomberg Markets
 Bloomberg News
 International Design Excellence Awards
 List of United States magazines

References

Further reading

External links

 

2009 mergers and acquisitions
Business magazines published in the United States
Weekly magazines published in the United States
Bloomberg L.P.
Magazines established in 1929
Magazines published in New York City